Macropodia is a genus of crabs, belonging to the family Inachidae. It contains the following species:

Macropodia cirripilus Kensley, 1980
Macropodia czernjawskii (Brandt, 1880)
Macropodia deflexa Forest, 1978
Macropodia doracis Manning & Holthuis, 1981
Macropodia falcifera (Stimpson, 1857)
Macropodia formosa Rathbun, 1911
Macropodia gilsoni (Capart, 1951)
Macropodia hesperiae Manning & Holthuis, 1981
Macropodia intermedia Bouvier, 1940
Macropodia linaresi Forest & Zariquiey Alvarez, 1964
Macropodia longicornis A. Milne-Edwards & Bouvier, 1899
Macropodia longipes (A. Milne-Edwards & Bouvier, 1899)
Macropodia longirostris (Fabricius, 1775)
Macropodia macrocheles (A. Milne-Edwards & Bouvier, 1898)
Macropodia parva Van Noort & Adema, 1985
Macropodia rostrata (Linnaeus, 1761)
Macropodia spinulosa (Miers, 1881)
Macropodia straeleni Capart, 1951
Macropodia tenuirostris (Leach, 1814)
Macropodia trigonus Richer de Forges, 1993

References

Majoidea